CD84 (Cluster of Differentiation 84) is a human protein encoded by the  gene.

Function 

Members of the CD2 (see MIM 186990) subgroup of the Ig superfamily, such as CD84, have similar patterns of conserved disulfide bonds and function in adhesion interactions between T lymphocytes and accessory cells.

Interactions 

CD84 has been shown to interact with SH2D1A.

See also 
 Cluster of differentiation

References

Further reading

External links 
 
 

Clusters of differentiation